Summer savory (Satureja hortensis) is among the best known of the savory genus. It is an annual, but otherwise is similar in use and flavor to the perennial winter savory.  It is used more often than winter savory, which has a slightly more bitter flavor.

This herb has lilac tubular flowers which bloom in the northern hemisphere from July to September.

Summer savory is a traditional popular herb in Atlantic Canada, where it is used in the same way sage is elsewhere. It also is used to make stews such as fricot, and in meat pies. It is usually available year-round in local grocery stores in dried form and is used in varying proportions, sometimes added to recipes in large generous heaping spoonfuls (such as in ), and sometimes more subtly (as in beans, for which savory has a natural affinity).

Summer savory is a characteristic ingredient of herbes de Provence.  It is also widely used as a seasoning for grilled meats and barbecues, as well as in stews and sauces.

Summer savory is preferred over winter savory for use in sausages because of its sweeter, more delicate aroma. It plays an important role in Bulgarian cuisine, providing a strong flavor to a variety of dishes. Instead of salt and pepper, a Bulgarian table will have three condiments: salt, red sweet pepper, and summer savory. When these are mixed it is called sharena sol ( 'speckled salt').

Summer savory, known as cimbru, is used in Romanian cuisine, especially in sarmale (stuffed cabbage or grape leaf rolls) and in mititei (grilled ground meat rolls).

The plant is called  in German, 
 in Dutch, 
 in French, 
 in Italian, 
 in Portuguese, 
 in Spanish, 
 in Greek, 
 in Polish, 
 in Bulgarian, 
 in Romanian, 
 in Hungarian, 

Summer savory is raised from seed grown in a rich, light soil. The seeds are very slow in germinating.

The early spring seedlings are often topped for fresh use in June. When the plants are in flower, they may be pulled up and dried for winter use.

See also
Winter savory

Sources

External links
 Grieves, A Modern Herbal

Lamiaceae
Herbs
Bulgarian cuisine
Romanian cuisine
Plants described in 1753
Flora of Europe
Flora of Asia